Ayatollah Abdul Rahman Heidari Ilami (1925 -  1 January 1987) was an Iranian-Kurdish Muslim scholar and member of the first term of the Assembly of Experts in Iran. He organised popular resistance to Iraq's invasion of Iran.

Ayatollah Heidari was a representative of Ayatollah Khomeini in Ilam Province in the Assembly of Experts. He established himself as a conservative thinker with his comments regarding the rule of the supreme leader and statements generally against liberal ideology.

Heidari died in 1986. His body was buried near the shrine of Fātimah bint Mūsā.

See also 

 List of members in the First Term of the Council of Experts
 List of Ayatollahs

References 

Iranian Islamic religious leaders
Members of the Assembly of Experts
Iranian Kurdish people